Tomasz Mokwa (born 10 February 1993) is a Polish professional footballer who plays as a right-back for Ekstraklasa side Piast Gliwice.

Honours

Club

Piast Gliwice
Ekstraklasa: 2018–19

References

External links
 
 

1993 births
Living people
Association football defenders
Polish footballers
Flota Świnoujście players
Piast Gliwice players
GKS Katowice players
I liga players
II liga players
Ekstraklasa players
Sportspeople from Słupsk